Line SFM3 is part of the Turin Metropolitan Railway Service. It links Turin to Bardonecchia and Susa.

Service was extended into France at Gare de Modane on 10 September 2017, and was offered on Sundays and public holidays. The extension has been discontinued in early 2020.

References

Turin Metropolitan Railway Service
Railway lines opened in 2012